Angkor Beer is a Cambodian lager, named after the iconic Khmer Angkor temples near Siem Reap. It is the most widely consumed beer in Cambodia. Along with Klang Beer, Bayon Beer, Angkor Extra Stout, and Black Panther Premium Stout, it is brewed at the Cambrew Brewery in Sihanoukville. Its official motto is "My Country, My Beer"

References

External links
Official site

Beer in Cambodia
Cambodian alcoholic drinks
Cambodian brands